Skinner House Books is a book publisher run by the Unitarian Universalist Association (UUA), specializing in books for Unitarian Universalists—meditation manuals, worship and church resources, and books on theology, UU history, and social justice concerns. The editorial direction of Skinner House is provided by the Skinner House Board, a body of UUA staff and non-staff.

The publisher began as an imprint of Beacon Press in 1976, and later split off, with its own name. Skinner House Books is named after Clarence Skinner (1881–1949), a Universalist minister, writer, and social activist who was Dean of the Crane Theological School at Tufts University.

References

External links 
 Skinner House Books

Publishing companies established in 1976
Book publishing companies of the United States
Unitarian Universalist organizations
1976 establishments in the United States